Hawthorne and Old Town Spring is a historic home and spring located at Winchester, Virginia, United States.  Hawthorne was built about 1811, and is a two-story, five bay, Late Georgian style stone dwelling with Federal style detailing. It has a hipped roof and rear service wing added about 1840.  The Old Town Spring is a brick spring house built about 1816.  Also on the property are contributing stone entry gateposts and walls and a stone garage built about 1915. The spring and the early-19th-century spring house that rests above it have been owned by the City for nearly 175 years.

It was added to the National Register of Historic Places in 2013.

References

Houses on the National Register of Historic Places in Virginia
Georgian architecture in Virginia
Federal architecture in Virginia
Houses completed in 1811
Houses in Winchester, Virginia
National Register of Historic Places in Winchester, Virginia
Angus McDonald family of Virginia and West Virginia
Agricultural buildings and structures on the National Register of Historic Places in Virginia
Spring houses
Springs of Virginia